Springfield is the third largest city in the U.S. state of Missouri and the county seat of Greene County. The city's population was 169,176 at the 2020 census. It is the principal city of the Springfield metropolitan area, which had an estimated population of 481,483 in 2021 and includes the counties of Christian, Dallas, Greene, Polk, and Webster, and is the fastest growing metropolitan area in the state of Missouri.

Springfield's nickname is "Queen City of the Ozarks" as well as "The 417" after the area code for the city. It is also known as the "Birthplace of Route 66". It is home to several universities and colleges, including Missouri State University, Drury University, and Evangel University. The city is an important center of education and medical care, with two of the largest hospitals in the area, CoxHealth and Mercy, employing over 20,000 people combined, and being the largest employers in the region. It has been called the "Buckle of the Bible Belt" due to its association with evangelical Christianity. The city and surrounding area have been growing more diverse over the decades. Between the 2010 and 2020 censuses, the population of Greene County grew by over 23,700 people, largely as a result of immigration.

The city sits on the Springfield Plateau of the Ozarks. Due to its proximity to the mountainous area, the city is known for its outdoor recreation activities. The city is the headquarters for Bass Pro Shops, which is the number one tourist attraction in the state of Missouri, and the adjoining Wonders of Wildlife Museum & Aquarium is the world's largest wildlife attraction. Springfield is within close distance to Wilson's Creek National Battlefield and sits along the Trail of Tears, now a national historic trail.

History

The origin of the city's name is unclear, but the most common view is that it was named for Springfield, Massachusetts, by migrants from that area. One account holds that James Wilson, who lived in the then unnamed city, offered free whiskey to anyone who would vote for the name Springfield, after his hometown in Massachusetts.

The editor of the Springfield Express, J. G. Newbill, said in the November 11, 1881, issue:"It has been stated that this city got its name from the fact of a spring and field being near by just west of town. But such is not a correct version. When the authorized persons met and adopted the title of the "Future Great" of the Southwest, several of the earliest settlers had handed in their favorite names, among whom was Kindred Rose, who presented the winning name, "Springfield," in honor of his former home town, Springfield, Tennessee."

In 1883, historian R. I. Holcombe wrote: 
"The town took its name from the circumstance of there being a spring under the hill, on the creek, while on top of the hill, where the principal portion of the town lay, there was a field."

Early settlement 
The presence of the Native Americans in the area slowed the European-American settlement of the land. Long before the 1830s, the native Kickapoo and Osage, and the Lenape (Delaware) from the mid-Atlantic coast had settled in this general area. The Osage had been the dominant tribe for more than a century in the larger region.

On the southeastern side of the city in 1812, about 500 Kickapoo Native Americans built a small village of about 100 wigwams. They abandoned the site in 1828. Ten miles south of the site of Springfield, the Lenape had built a substantial dwelling of houses that borrowed elements of Anglo colonial style from the mid-Atlantic, where their people had migrated from.

The first European-American settlers to the area were John Polk Campbell and his brother, who moved to the area in 1829 from Tennessee. Campbell chose the area because of the presence of a natural well that flowed into a small stream. He staked his claim by carving his initials in a tree. Campbell was joined by settlers Thomas Finney, Samuel Weaver, and Joseph Miller. They cleared the land of trees to develop it for farms. A small general store was soon opened.

In 1833, the southern part of the state was named Greene County after Revolutionary War hero General Nathanael Greene. Campbell Township was one of the seven original townships organized on March 11, 1833, when Greene County was much larger. An 1876 map shows it boundaries include all the sections in T29N and R21 and 22W. It was bounded by Center Township on the west, Robberson, and Franklin Townships on the north, Taylor Township on the east, and Wilson and Clay Townships on the south. (Later, Campbell was split into Campbell No. 1 Township and Campbell No. 2 Township, then into North Campbell No. 1 Township, North Campbell No. 2 Township, and North Campbell No. 3 Township.)

The county seat of Springfield is located in Campbell Township due to the efforts of John Polk Campbell. The township is named after John Polk Campbell, who donated the land for Springfield's public square and platted the town site. He deeded 50 acres of land to the legislature for the creation of a county seat in 1835. Campbell laid out city streets and lots. The town was incorporated in 1838. In 1878, the town got its nickname the "Queen City of the Ozarks."

The United States government enforced Indian Removal during the 1830s, forcing land cessions in the Southeast and other areas, and relocating tribes to Indian Territory, which later developed as Oklahoma. During the 1838 relocation of Cherokee natives, the Trail of Tears passed through Springfield to the west, along the Old Wire Road.

Civil War 
By 1861, Springfield's population had grown to approximately 2,000, and it had become an important commercial hub. In the late 1850s, telegraph lines, previously only to St. Louis, reached Springfield. News from point further west was brought to Springfield overland and then sent by telegraph to what was then called the New York Associated Press. At the start of the American Civil War, Springfield was divided in its loyalty, as it had been settled by people from both the North and South, as well as by German immigrants in the mid-19th century who tended to support the Union.

The Union and Confederate armies both recognized the city's strategic importance and sought to control it. They fought the Battle of Wilson's Creek on August 10, 1861, a few miles southwest of town. The battle was a Confederate victory, and Nathaniel Lyon became the first Union General killed in Civil War. Union troops retreated to Lebanon to regroup. When they returned, they found that most of the Confederate army had withdrawn.

On October 25, 1861, Union Major Charles Zagonyi led an attack against the remaining Confederates in the area, in a battle known as the First Battle of Springfield, or Zagonyi's Charge. Zagonyi's men removed the Confederate flag from Springfield's public square and returned to camp. It was the only Union victory in southwestern Missouri in 1861. The increased military activity in the area set the stage for the Battle of Pea Ridge in northern Arkansas in March 1862.

On January 8, 1863, Confederate forces under General John S. Marmaduke advanced to take control of Springfield and an urban fight ensued. But that evening, the Confederates withdrew. This became known as the Second Battle of Springfield. Marmaduke sent a message to the Union forces asking that the Confederate casualties have a proper burial. The city remained under Union control for the remainder of the war. The US army used Springfield as a supply base and central point of operation for military activities in the area.

Promptly after the Civil War ended on July 21, 1865, Wild Bill Hickok shot and killed Davis Tutt in a shootout over a disagreement about a debt Tutt claimed Hickok owed him. During a poker game at the former Lyon House Hotel, in response to the disagreement over the amount, Tutt had taken Hickok's watch, which Hickok demanded he return immediately. Hickok warned that Tutt had better not be seen wearing that watch, then spotted him wearing it in Park Central Square, prompting the gunfight.

On January 25, 1866, Hickok was still in Springfield when he witnessed a Springfield police officer, John Orr, shoot and kill James Coleman after Coleman interfered with the arrest of Coleman's friend Bingham, who was drunk and disorderly. Hickok provided testimony in the case. Orr was arrested, released on bail, and immediately fled the country. He was never brought to trial or heard from again.

Race relations

Lynchings
From the period after Reconstruction into the early 20th century, lynchings of freedmen and their descendants occurred in some cities and counties in Missouri, particularly in former slaveholding areas.

On April 14, 1906, a white mob broke into the Springfield county jail, and lynched two black men, Horace Duncan and Fred Coker, for allegedly sexually assaulting Mina Edwards, a white woman. Later they returned to the jail, where other African-American prisoners were being held, and pulled out Will Allen, who had been accused of murdering a white man. All three suspects were hanged from the Gottfried Tower, which held a replica of the Statue of Liberty, and burned in the courthouse square by a mob of more than 2,000 citizens. Judge Azariah W. Lincoln called for a grand jury, but no one was prosecuted. The proceedings were covered by national newspapers, the New York Times and Los Angeles Times.

Duncan's and Coker's employer testified that they were at his business at the time of the crime against Edwards, and other evidence suggested that they and Allen were all innocent. These three are the only recorded lynchings in Greene County. But the extrajudicial murders were part of a pattern of discrimination, repeated violence and intimidation of African Americans in this city and southwest Missouri from 1894 to 1909, in an attempt to expel them from the region. Whites in Lawrence County also lynched three African-American men in this period. After the mass lynching in Springfield, many African Americans left the area in a large exodus.

A historic plaque on the southeast corner of the Springfield courthouse square commemorates Duncan, Coker, and Allen, the three victims of mob violence.

Country music
Four nationally broadcast television series originated from the city between 1955 and 1961: Ozark Jubilee and its spin-off, Five Star Jubilee; Talent Varieties; and The Eddy Arnold Show. All were carried live by ABC except for Five Star Jubilee on NBC and were produced by Springfield's Crossroads TV Productions, owned by Ralph D. Foster. Many of the biggest names in country music frequently visited or lived in Springfield at the time. City officials estimated the programs meant about 2,000 weekly visitors and "over $1,000,000 in fresh income."

Staged at the Jewell Theatre (demolished in 1961), Ozark Jubilee was the first national country music TV show to feature top stars and attract a significant viewership. Five Star Jubilee, produced from the Landers Theatre, was the first network color television series to originate outside of New York City or Hollywood. Ironically, Springfield's NBC affiliate, KYTV-TV (which helped produce the program), was not equipped to broadcast in color and aired the show in black-and-white.

The ABC, NBC and Mutual radio networks also all carried country music shows nationally from Springfield during the decade, including KWTO'S Korn's-A-Krackin (Mutual).

The Ozark Hillbilly Medallion
The Springfield Chamber of Commerce once presented visiting dignitaries with an "Ozark Hillbilly Medallion" and a certificate proclaiming the honoree a "hillbilly of the Ozarks". On June 7, 1953, U.S. President Harry Truman received the medallion after a breakfast speech at the Shrine Mosque for a reunion of the 35th Division. Other recipients included US Army generals Omar Bradley and Matthew Ridgway, US Representative Dewey Short, J. C. Penney, Johnny Olson, Ralph Story and disc jockey Nelson King.

Geography

Springfield is on the Springfield Plateau of the Ozarks region of southwest Missouri.

The city of Springfield is mainly flat with rolling hills and cliffs surrounding its south, east, and north sections. Springfield is on the Springfield Plateau, which reaches from Northwest Arkansas to Central Missouri. Most of the plateau is characterized by forest, pastures and shrub-scrub habitats. Many streams and tributaries, such as the James River, Galloway Creek and Jordan Creek, flow within or near the city. Nearby lakes include Table Rock Lake, Stockton Lake, McDaniel Lake, Fellows Lake, Lake Springfield, and Pomme de Terre Lake.

Climate

Springfield has an average surface wind velocity comparable to Chicago's, according to information compiled at the National Climatic Data Center at NOAA. It is placed within "Power Class 3" in the Wind Energy Resource Atlas published by a branch of the U.S. Department of Energy; having an average wind speed range of 6.4 to 7.0 miles per hour.

Springfield lies in the northern limits of a humid subtropical climate (Cfa), as defined by the Köppen climate classification system. As such, it experiences times of exceptional humidity; especially in late summer.

According to a 2007 story in Forbes magazine's list of "America's Wildest Weather Cities" and the Weather Variety Index, Springfield is the city with the most varied weather in the United States. On May 1, 2013, Springfield reached a high temperature of 81 degrees Fahrenheit. By the evening of May 2, snow was falling, persisting into the following day and eventually accumulating to about two inches.

Demographics

2020 census
As of the 2020 census, there were 169,176 people, 80,693 households, and 36,237 families residing in the city. The population density was 1,951.8 inhabitants per square mile (753.6/km2). There were 77,620 housing units at an average density of 949.8 per square mile (366.7/km2). The racial makeup of the city was 81% White, 79.4% Non-Hispanic White, 5% African American, 0.8% Native American, 2.3% Asian, 0.2% Pacific Islander, 2.2% from other races and 9% from two or more races. Hispanic or Latino of any race were 6% of the population.

There were 80,693 households, of which 17.5% had children under the age of 18 living with them, 30% were married couples living together, 9.6% had a female householder with no spouse present, 5.2% had a male householder with no wife present, and 55.1% were non-families and 12.2% had someone living alone who was 65 years of age or older. The average household size was 1.94 and the average family size was 2.68.
The median age in the city was 33.6 years. 17.9% of residents were under the age of 18; 19.1% were between the ages of 18 and 24; 26.5% were from 25 to 44; 20.9% were from 45 to 64; and 15.6% were 65 years of age or older. The gender makeup of the city was 48.6% male and 51.4% female.

2010 census
As of the 2010 census, there were 159,498 people, 69,754 households, and 35,453 families residing in the city. The racial makeup of the city was 88.7% White, 4.1% African American, 0.8% Native American, 1.9% Asian, 0.2% Pacific Islander, 1.2% from other races, and 3.2% from two or more races. Hispanic or Latino of any race were 3.7% of the population.

There were 69,754 households, of which 23.4% had children under the age of 18 living with them, 34.4% were married couples living together, 11.8% had a female householder with no husband present, 4.7% had a male householder with no wife present, and 49.2% were non-families. 37.3% of all households were made up of individuals, and 11.8% had someone living alone who was 65 years of age or older. The average household size was 2.13 and the average family size was 2.81.

The median age in the city was 33.2 years. 18.3% of residents were under the age of 18; 18.4% were between the ages of 18 and 24; 26% were from 25 to 44; 22.7% were from 45 to 64; and 14.5% were 65 years of age or older. The gender makeup of the city was 48.5% male and 51.5% female.

2000 census
According to the 2000 United States Census, 151,580 people, 64,691 households, and 35,709 families resided in the city. The population density was 2,072.0 people per square mile (800.0/km2). There were 69,650 housing units at an average density of 952.1/mi2 (367.6/km2). The racial makeup of the city was 91.69% White, 3.27% African American, 0.75% Native American, 1.36% Asian, 0.09% Pacific Islander, 0.88% from other races, and 1.95% from two or more races. Hispanic or Latino of any race were 2.31% of the population.

There were 64,691 households, out of which 24.0% had children under the age of 18 living with them, 40.7% were married couples living together, 10.9% had a female householder with no husband present, and 44.8% were non-families. 35.3% of all households were made up of individuals, and 11.6% had someone living alone who was 65 years of age or older. The average household size was 2.17 and the average family size was 2.82. In the city 19.9% were under the age of 18, 17.4% from 18 to 24, 28.0% from 25 to 44, 19.8% from 45 to 64, and 14.9% were 65 years of age or older. The median age was 34 years. For every 100 females, there were 92.9 males. For every 100 females age 18 and over, there were 90.0 males.

The median income for a household in the city was $29,563, and the median income for a family was $38,114. Males had a median income of $27,778 versus $20,980 for females. The per capita income for the city was $17,711. About 9.9% of families and 15.9% of the population were below the poverty line, including 19.1% of those under age 18 and 7.9% of those age 65 or over.

Neighborhoods

Registered neighborhoods include University Heights, Bissett, Bradford Park, Doling, Grant Beach, Heart of the Westside, Midtown, Oak Grove, Parkcrest, Phelps Grove, Robberson, Rountree, Tom Watkins, Weller, West Central, Westside Community Betterment, and Woodland Heights.

Affiliated neighborhood groups unregistered with the city include:

 Chesterfield Village
 Cinnamon On The Hill
 Cinnamon Square
 Coachlight
 Cooper Estates
 Fox Grape
 Kay Pointe
 Kingsbury Forest 
 Lakewood Village
 Mission Hills
 National Place
 Parkwest Village
 Parkwood Survival
 Quail Creek
 Ravenwood South
 Sherman Ave Project Area
 Spring Creek

Economy
Springfield's economy is based on health care, manufacturing, retail, education, and tourism. With a Gross Metropolitan Product of $13.66 billion in 2004 and $18.6 billion in 2016, the city’s economy makes up 6.7% of the Gross State Product of Missouri.

Total retail sales exceed $4.1 billion annually in Springfield and $5.8 billion in the Springfield MSA. Its largest shopping mall is Battlefield Mall. According to the Springfield Convention & Visitors Bureau, an estimated 3,000,000 overnight visitors and day-trippers annually visit the city. The city has more than 60 lodging facilities and 6,000 hotel rooms. The Convention & Visitors Bureau spends more than $1,000,000 annually marketing the city as a travel destination.

Positronic, Bass Pro Shops, John Q. Hammons Hotels & Resorts, BKD, Noble & Associates, Prime, Inc., Springfield ReManufacturing, Andy's Frozen Custard, and O'Reilly Auto Parts all have their national headquarters in Springfield. In addition, two major American Christian denominations — General Council of the Assemblies of God in the United States of America (one of the largest of the Pentecostal denominations) and Baptist Bible Fellowship International (a fundamentalist Baptist denomination) — are headquartered in the city.

According to the Springfield Area Chamber of Commerce, the top 2019 employers in the metro area are:

Government
Springfield’s city government is based on the council–manager system. By charter, the city has eight council members, each elected for a four-year term on a nonpartisan basis, and a mayor elected for a two-year term. Jason Gage, the City Manager, appointed by the Council, serves as the chief executive and administrative officer for the City and is responsible for directing the overall operations of the City of Springfield and for executing all policies and programs authorized by City Council. Anita Cotter, the City Clerk, appointed by the council to serve as the Chief of Staff for City Council Members and Custodian of Records, coordinates and responds to all Sunshine Requests and maintains official City records, including minutes, ordinances, resolutions, contracts, and other vital documents. The presiding officer at council meetings is the mayor. Council meetings are held every other Monday night in City Council Chambers. City Council elections are held the first Tuesday in April.

City Utilities of Springfield (CU) is a city-owned utility serving the Springfield area with electricity, natural gas, water, telecommunications and transit services. CU provides service to over 115,000 electric, 84,000 natural gas, and 83,000 water customers.

Education
Springfield has several universities, colleges, and high schools with three of the main higher learning institutions, Missouri State, Drury, and OTC, are all located in and around downtown Springfield.

Universities 

Founded in 1905 as the Fourth District Normal School, Missouri State University (MSU) is the state's second largest university by enrollment, with over 23,000 students.

Drury University is a private university with over 1,000 students Founded in 1873 by congregationalist, it was modelled after schools like Yale and Harvard. It is ranked as number 2 for best value schools and number 12 for best university in the Midwest according to US News.

Evangel University is from a 2013 consolidation of Central Bible College and Assemblies of God Theological Seminary.

University extensions 
Lindenwood University opened a Springfield extension from their College of Education and Human Services.

University of Missouri has an extension focused on agriculture.

Branch campuses 
University of Missouri opened a clinical campus in 2016 for their medical school to increase their class size.

Other branches include Mercy College of Nursing and Health Sciences of Southwest Baptist University, Everest College, Columbia College, Webster University, and University of Phoenix.

Colleges 
Ozarks Technical Community College (OTC) is the second largest college in the city of Springfield, having more than 11,000 students in attendance.

Other colleges in Springfield include Baptist Bible College, Assemblies of God Theological Seminary, and Cox College (Nursing and Allied Health).

High schools 
The Springfield Public School District is the largest district in the state of Missouri with an official fall 2011 enrollment of 24,366 students attending 50 schools. Public high schools include Central High School, Kickapoo High School, Hillcrest High School, Parkview High School, and Glendale High School.

Private high schools include Springfield Sudbury School, Summit Preparatory School, Greenwood Laboratory School, New Covenant Academy, Springfield Catholic High School, Christian Schools of Springfield, and Grace Classical Academy.

Parks and recreation

The Springfield-Greene County Park Board manages 3,200 acres and 103 sites, including the Nathanael Greene/Close Memorial Park, which contains the historic Gray-Campbell Farmstead, Mizumoto Japanese Stroll Garden, Master Gardener demonstration gardens, Bill Roston Native Butterfly House, and Springfield-Greene County Botanical Center; the Rutledge-Wilson Farm Community Park; the Mediacom Ice Park; the Cooper Park and Sports Complex; Dickerson Park Zoo; and various other public parks, community centers, and facilities.

The non-profit Ozark Greenways Inc. promotes trail recreation and local bicycling through the establishment of greenway trails, including a 35-mile crushed-gravel trail, the Frisco Highline Trail connecting Springfield to the town of Bolivar, and smaller trails connecting parks and sites of interest within the town and county.

The Missouri Department of Conservation operates the Springfield Nature Center and numerous nearby conservation areas.

The National Park Service operates the nearby Wilson's Creek National Battlefield.

Springfield's metropolitan area is situated within close distance of recreational lakes, waterways, caves, and forests, such as the James River, Busiek State Forest, Lake Springfield, Table Rock Lake, Buffalo National River, Ozark National Scenic Riverways, Fellows Lake, and Fantastic Caverns.

Culture
Like many cities across the nation, Springfield has seen a resurgence in its downtown area. Many of the older buildings have been, and are continuing to be, renovated into mixed-use buildings such as lofts, office space, restaurants, coffee shops, bars, boutiques, and music venues. The Downtown Springfield Community Improvement District (CID) has historic theaters that have been restored to their original state, including the Gillioz Theatre and the Landers Theatre.

In 2001, Phase I of Jordan Valley Park opened along with the Mediacom Ice Park. Phase II of Jordan Valley Park was completed in 2012. 2001 also saw the opening of The Creamery Arts Center, a city-owned building inside Jordan Valley Park. It is home to the Springfield Regional Arts Council, Springfield Regional Opera, Springfield Ballet, and the Springfield Symphony Orchestra and provides office and meeting space for other arts organizations which serve the community. The center has been renovated to include two art galleries with monthly exhibitions, an Arts Library, rehearsal studios, and classrooms offering art workshops and hands-on activities. The facilities also include an outdoor classroom.

A March 2009 New York Times article described the history and ascendancy of cashew chicken in Springfield, where local variations of the popular Chinese dish are ubiquitous.

Cultural organizations 

The Springfield Opera has operated in the city for nearly 40 years. In its history, the opera has performed various well known shows, such as The Barber of Seville, La bohème and Carmen.

The Springfield Ballet was founded in 1978 as a not-for-profit to bring ballet to the region. The first performance was held at the Springfield Art Museum in November 1976, and the first public performance in March 1977. The ballet currently performs at the Landers Theatre in downtown Springfield, and has performed with the Springfield Symphony for holiday programs.

The Springfield Little Theatre was founded in 1934 and purchased the Landers Theatre in 1970 for its permanent performance venue. The theatre is the oldest civic theatre in Missouri and one of the oldest in the Midwest, attended by 60,000 people yearly. Its venue, the Landers, has been the setting for performances by actors such as Kathleen Turner, Tess Harper, and Lucas Grabeel.

The Springfield Symphony was founded in 1935 and is one of the oldest arts organizations in the city. The symphony was one of the founding members of the American Symphony Orchestra League, now known as the League of American Orchestras, the largest international body for symphonies and orchestras. The symphony performs monthly at Juanita K. Hammons Hall.

The Springfield Art Museum was started by a small group of women, headed by Deborah D. Weisel. Within two years of its original founding as an art study club, the museum had been formed and began showing travelling exhibitions from cities like New York and Philadelphia. In 1948, the museum was handed into the control of the city. In 2018, a 30-year plan was revealed with the intent of updating the museum to be comparable to the Nelson-Atkins Museum of Art in Kansas City and Crystal Bridges Museum of American Art in Northwest Arkansas, capitalizing on its central location in the city and adjacent park space.

In 1938, a Springfield flag was made official. It resembled the flag of St. Louis (which was later replaced by a new flag). In 2017, the Springfield Flag Movement proposed a new flag for Springfield, arguing that the current flag is disconnected from modern Springfield culture, as it "doesn't speak to the unique history and identity of Springfield". On January 10, 2022, Springfield's city council voted 7–2 in favor of adopting the Springfield Flag Movement's proposed flag as the official city flag. The new flag was officially adopted by the city on March 1, 2022.

Festivals and events 
The Missouri Food Truck Festival has been held in Springfield for several years and brings food trucks from Springfield and surrounding states to be sampled for a single event. Like most local events, it includes live music and allows people to travel from one food truck to another to sample various specialties from various cuisines.

First Friday is a monthly event held in downtown Springfield that allows local artists to show off their works and encourages people to stroll the streets and art galleries to look at local works of art. The event is sponsored by the Springfield Regional Arts Council and has been a regular event in the city since 2001. 

Cider Days is a two-day event held on Walnut Street downtown featuring local artists showing their crafts, fall themed activities and performances by local groups, as well as cider sampling. Arts Fest is held in May also on Walnut Street downtown, and features similar art vendors showing crafts as well as entertainment for children.

Recently, the city has started to host an annual Route 66 Festival downtown along Route 66 and in Park Central Square. A parade starts the event with a collection of dozens of vintage cars traveling along the former highway. There are also live performances in Park Central Square as people move around St. Louis Street to observe classic cars and browse items from vendors selling artwork and literature about Route 66. The event also holds a 6.6 kilometer run. The 2018 festival lasted two days and was attended by 56,000 people.

The Japanese Fall Festival usually takes place in September at the Springfield Botanical Gardens in Nathanael Greene Park. The event is put on by the Sister Cities Association and commemorates Japanese culture, often involving visitors from Springfield's sister city of Isesaki, offering Japanese tea, giving live performances and selling traditional items like Bonsai and kimono dresses. Springfield in turns sends local groups to Isesaki's city festival each year.

Several holiday events take place in Springfield, including the yearly Downtown Christmas Parade showcasing local schools and businesses sponsoring floats. There's also a yearly lighting of a Christmas tree at Park Central Square and the Festival of Lights in Jordan Valley Park. During Halloween, locals dance to Michael Jackson's Thriller on Commercial Street to a large audience.

Museums and points of interest

Air & Military Museum of the Ozarks
American Civil War Library at Wilson's Creek National Battlefield
Battle of Springfield Driving Tour
Commercial Street Historic District
The Creamery Arts Center
Dickerson Park Zoo
Discovery Center of Springfield
Dr. Michael J. Clarke History Museum of Ozarks Scouting
Flower Pentecostal Heritage Center
Founders Park

Gray-Campbell Farmstead
History Museum on the Square
Missouri Institute of Natural Science - Riverbluff Cave
Springfield Art Museum
Springfield-Greene County Library District
St. John's Episcopal Church
Trail of Tears National Historic Trail
US Route 66 marker
Wild Bill Hickok–Davis Tutt shootout site
Wonders of Wildlife Museum & Aquarium

Sports
Springfield plays host to college teams from Missouri State University (NCAA Division I), Drury University (NCAA Division II), and Evangel University (NAIA). Great Southern Bank Arena (capacity 11,000) opened in 2008 and is home to the Missouri State Bears and Lady Bears basketball teams, and the O'Reilly Family Event Center, which opened in 2010, is now home to the Drury Panthers men's and women's basketball teams. 

The Springfield Cardinals, the Double-A affiliate of the St. Louis Cardinals, have played at Hammons Field in downtown Springfield since their inaugural season in 2005 after the team moved from El Paso. There have been more than 100 Springfield Cardinals who have gone on to play for St. Louis. Springfield has had minor league teams dating back to 1905, and this city has hosted various exposition games.

Springfield Rugby Football Club (SRFC) was established in 1983 and is a well-known rugby club in the Midwestern United States. SRFC plays in Division II of the Frontier Region of the Western Conference which runs teams for men, women and youth.

The PGA sponsored Price Cutter Charity Championship is played at Highland Springs Country Club on the southeast side of Springfield every year. The event is sponsored by Dr Pepper. Since the event started in 1990, more than $14 million has been raised for local children's charities. 

Springfield has hosted various sporting events. Missouri State's campus in Springfield has hosted the Missouri Special Olympics several times. Springfield has also hosted the Show-Me Games and regularly hosts the Missouri Winter Games in the sports of racquetball, trap shooting, swimming, volleyball and gymnastics. In 2019 and 2020, Springfield will the host of the NAIA Softball Championship World Series. Springfield has also been the host of the Missouri Valley Conference baseball tournament, as well as finals for the Missouri Valley Conference in sports like tennis and volleyball. As a city with a World TeamTennis team, Springfield has hosted final games at Cooper Tennis Complex.

The Missouri Sports Hall of Fame is located in the city. Opening in 1994, the hall of fame contains over four thousand sports related items and exhibits. Each year the hall inducts new members who have contributed to sports in the state of Missouri, including athletes, coaches, physical therapists, winning sports teams and Olympic athletes.

Beginning in 2003, Springfield was only one of thirteen cities in the United States to be a part of the US Olympic Committee's Olympic Development Program. The goal of the program was to develop beginning athletes into elite athletes, with Springfield's program focusing on archery, hockey, tennis and volleyball. Despite the end of the Olympic program in all cities, the city maintains the program as the Community Sports Development Program sponsored by the Springfield Greene County Park Board.

Transportation

Highways
Springfield is served by Interstate 44, which connects the city with St. Louis and Tulsa, Oklahoma. Route 13 (Kansas Expressway) carries traffic north towards Kansas City. U.S. Route 60, U.S. Route 65, and U.S. Route 160 pass through the city. The average commuting time was 17.7 minutes from 2013 to 2017.

Major streets include Glenstone Avenue, Sunshine Street (Missouri Route 413), National Avenue, Division Street, Campbell Avenue, Kansas Expressway, Battlefield Road, Republic Road, West Bypass, Chestnut Expressway, and Kearney Street.

Springfield is also the site of the first diverging diamond interchange within the United States, at the intersection of I-44 and MO-13 (Kansas Expressway) (at ).

U.S. Route 66 and U.S. Route 166 formerly passed through Springfield, and sections of historic US 66 can still be seen in the city. US 166's eastern terminus was once in the northeast section of the city, and US 60 (westbound) originally ended in downtown Springfield. US 60 now goes through town on James River Freeway. In mid-November 2013, the city began discussing plans to upgrade sections of Schoolcraft Freeway (Highway 65) and James River Freeway (Highway 60) through the city to Interstate 44. The main reason is to minimize confusion should there be an incident on I-44 as a detour route.

Airport
Springfield-Branson National Airport (SGF) serves the city with direct flights to 14 cities. It is the principal air gateway to the Springfield region. The Downtown Airport is also a public-use airport located near downtown. In May 2009, the Springfield-Branson airport opened a new passenger terminal. Financing included $97 million in revenue bonds issued by the airport and $20 million of discretionary federal aviation funds, with no city taxes used. The building includes , 10 gates (expandable to 60) and 1,826 parking spaces. Direct connections from Springfield are available to Atlanta, Austin, Charlotte, Chicago, Dallas, Denver, Destin/Fort Walton Beach, Punta Gorda/Fort Myers, Houston, Las Vegas, Los Angeles, Orlando, Phoenix and Tampa. No international flights have regular service into Springfield-Branson, but it does serve international charters.

Trains
Passenger trains have not served Springfield since 1967, but more than 65 freight trains travel to, from, and through the city each day. Springfield was once home to the headquarters and main shops of the St. Louis-San Francisco Railroad (Frisco). Into the 1960s, the Kansas City-Florida Special ran from Kansas City Union Station to Jacksonville, Florida, and the Sunnyland ran between Kansas City and Birmingham and New Orleans. The railroad also operated two daily trains to St. Louis Union Station through its Springfield station: the Meteor and the Will Rogers. Both continued southwest to Oklahoma City Union Station via Tulsa Union Depot. The Meteor continued on to Lawton, Oklahoma. The Frisco's final passenger train was the Southland (Kansas City - Memphis - Birmingham), a successor to the Sunnyland.

As late as 1949 the Missouri Pacific had a short branch line connection from the company's Springfield station to Crane, whereupon connections could be made to the Southern Scenic on the railroad's Kansas City to Newport, Arkansas, line.

The Frisco was absorbed by the Burlington Northern (BN) in 1980, and in 1994 the BN merged with the Santa Fe, creating the current Burlington Northern Santa Fe (BNSF) Railway. BNSF has three switch yards (two small) in Springfield. Mainlines to and from Kansas City, St. Louis, Memphis and Tulsa converge at the railroad's yard facility in northern Springfield. In October 2006, BNSF announced plans to upgrade its Tulsa and Memphis mainlines into Springfield to handle an additional four to six daily intermodal freight trains between the West Coast and the Southeast. The Missouri and Northern Arkansas Railroad also operates several miles of (former Missouri Pacific) industrial track in the city.

Buses
City Utilities of Springfield operates local bus service. Greyhound Lines serves Springfield on its line from New York to Los Angeles. Jefferson Lines serves Springfield on its line from Kansas City to Little Rock/Pine Bluff.

Healthcare

Springfield is a regional medical hub with the healthcare field employing a large number of people in the city. Major care providers include CoxHealth, Mercy, Ozarks Community Hospital and Jordan Valley Community Health Center, with Mercy being classified amongst the top 100 hospitals in the country. The industry employs more than 30,000 people in the Springfield metro.

CoxHealth is a private not-for-profit healthcare system headquartered in Springfield. It is ranked in the top ten hospitals in Missouri and it is a seven time top 100 hospital system operating six hospitals, over 80 clinics, health plans and other facilities and employing over 12,100 people in southwest Missouri and Northwest Arkansas. The largest of the network's hospitals, Cox South is a level one trauma, stroke, and STEMI Center. Cox also runs a Children's Miracle Network Hospital for specialized pediatric care.

Mercy Hospital Springfield, part of the Mercy Health System based in St. Louis, is ranked number six in the state. It has a Level 1 Trauma Center and runs a pediatric cancer center. Mercy Springfield is one of only six St. Jude Children's Research Hospital affiliates in the country, located inside the Jane Pitt Pediatric Cancer Center named for Jane Pitt, mother of actor and Springfield native, Brad Pitt, who helped to fund the center with help from his brother, businessman Douglas Pitt, sister Julie, and then partner, actress Angelina Jolie.

Both Cox and Mercy maintain Ronald McDonald House Charities and houses for families of those who have children undergoing medical treatment.

The United States Medical Center for Federal Prisoners, one of six federal institutions designed to handle federal inmates' medical concerns, is located at the corner of W. Sunshine Street and Kansas Expressway. Several high-profile criminals, including several mob bosses have been housed at the center. Among them, Joseph Bonanno of the Bonanno crime family and John Gotti of the Gambino crime family, who died in the center. The center also housed mass murderer Jared Lee Loughner, who perpetrated the 2011 Tucson shooting injuring US Representative Gabby Giffords.

Media

Print 
The city's major daily newspaper is the Springfield News-Leader, which circulates to more than 50,000 people on Sundays. Other newspapers for Springfield include Daily Events, Springfield Business Journal, which is a weekly paper that provides comprehensive business news, and The Standard which is Missouri State University's in-school newspaper, and Ozarks Independent, an online local news publication.

In addition to newspapers, Springfield is the base of 417 Magazine, a local lifestyle and entertainment magazine showcasing restaurants, attractions and local businesses in the 417 area code. The Magazine also maintains 417 Biz for business and networking information highlighting local businesspeople and entrepreneurs, as well as 417 Bride for wedding and bridal related content.

Television 
As of 2021, the Springfield media market ranks 74th in the nation, amongst markets like Omaha, Nebraska, and Columbia, South Carolina. The area is composed of 31 counties in southwest Missouri and Arkansas. As of 2021, there are 432,370 television-owning households.

Radio

Film 
The city has a history dating back to the 1950s in film and television. Several films, such as The Winning Team (1952) starring Doris Day, Frank Lovejoy and future U.S. President Ronald Reagan, held their premieres in Springfield at the Gillioz Theatre downtown. Reagan, along with his wife Nancy Reagan and President Harry S. Truman, were in attendance.

Springfield was home to the country music television show Ozark Jubilee.

In 2007, Springfield was one of more than a dozen other Springfields in the country vying to host the premiere of The Simpsons Movie through an online video competition voted on by readers of USA Today. The premiere was ultimately hosted in Springfield, Vermont.

Springfield hosts the SATO 48 film contest (Springfield And The Ozarks 48-Hour Film Challenge) every spring in which filmmakers have 48 hours to make a film running five minutes or less.

In 2018, a new film festival, Rated SGF, began in Springfield. The event is hosted by the Film and Media Association of Springfield and the Downtown Springfield Association.

Notable people
List of people from Springfield, Missouri

Sister cities

See also

Murder of Dee Dee Blanchard
List of mayors of Springfield, Missouri
Springfield Three
Tiny Town

Notes

References

Further reading
 McIntyre, Stephen L., ed. Springfield's Urban Histories: Essays on the Queen City of the Missouri Ozarks (Springfield: Moon City Press, 2012) 352 pp.

External links

City of Springfield
Springfield Convention & Visitors Bureau
Springfield Area Chamber of Commerce
Downtown Springfield
 Historic maps of Springfield in the Sanborn Maps of Missouri Collection at the University of Missouri

 
Cities in Missouri
Cities in Christian County, Missouri
Cities in Greene County, Missouri
Springfield metropolitan area, Missouri
County seats in Missouri
1835 establishments in Missouri
Populated places established in 1835